Third Eye Open may refer to:

 Third Eye Open (Hardware album), 1992
 Third Eye Open: The String Tribute to Tool, 2001